D'Andre Wood (born December 16, 1988) is a former American college football cornerback and a current student at Belhaven University in Jackson, Mississippi. He is a highly decorated player with football achievement and quickly drew attention with his athletic running and jumping after running a sub 4.4 forty yard dash and jumping a 10'9 in the broad jump. He also tested a 4.19 short shuttle and 38 inch vertical.

He has been invited to play in the South Carolina College Football Senior Bowl. He is the only NAIA players in the game.

References 
Football: UNT secondary loses another recruit

American football cornerbacks
Living people
1988 births